Murder Twice Told is a collection of two short thrillers by Donald Hamilton.

Contents
 Deadfall, 3
 The Black Cross, 105

Television adaptation 
Deadfall was adapted for Suspense and broadcast 1/12/1951.

Publication history
1947, United States, The Black Cross, The American Magazine, Sep 1947
1949, United States, Deadfall, Collier's, 9/3/1949, 9/10/1949, 9/17/1949, serial (literature)
1950, United States, Rinehart, hardcover
1950, United States, Walter J. Black, Detective Book Club edition, hardcover
1952, United States, Dell, Mapback #577, paperback
1952, UK, Allan Wingate, hardcover
1966, United States, Fawcett, Gold Medal d1623, paperback

1950 short story collections
Thriller short story collections
Short story collections by Donald Hamilton